Sabur ibn Ardashir (also spelled Shapur) was a Persian statesman who served as the vizier of the Buyids of Iraq briefly in 990 and later from 996 to 999.

Biography 
Of aristocratic origin, and of probable royal descent from an Iranian dynasty, Sabur was born in 942 at his native city of Shiraz. He was the son of a certain Ardashir, and occupied high offices during his early career, and eventually became vizier of the Buyid ruler Baha' al-Dawla in 990, thus succeeding the Dailamite vizier Ibn Salihan. However, Sabur's vizierate lasted briefly, and he was eventually succeeded by another person. 

One year later, Sabur founded a major Shia library in Karkh. Later in 996, Sabur was re-appointed by Baha' al-Dawla as his vizier, and continued to serve in the office until 999. One year later, Sabur served as the deputy of his successor, Abu Ali al-Muwaffaq. After some time, Sabur withdrew from Buyid politics, and spent the rest of his life in Baghdad, where died in 1025.

Sources 
 
 

Buyid viziers
11th-century Iranian politicians
10th-century Iranian politicians
942 births
1025 deaths
People from Shiraz